Francis Blomfield (1827 – 5 June 1860) was an English cricketer. He played one first-class match for Cambridge University Cricket Club in 1848. He drowned after the SS Northina crashed into rocks off the coast of California.

See also
 List of Cambridge University Cricket Club players

References

External links
 

1827 births
1860 deaths
English cricketers
Cambridge University cricketers
Deaths due to shipwreck at sea